From the Soul is a 1992 jazz album by American saxophonist and composer Joe Lovano, generally regarded as his masterpiece. It was recorded with a studio band rather than Lovano's working group; it is notable for his only encounter with Michel Petrucciani (who plays in a more abstract, Paul Bleyish style than was usual with him), and for being one of Ed Blackwell's final recordings.

Track listing
All compositions by Joe Lovano except as indicated
"Evolution"  – 8:59
"Portrait of Jennie" (Gordon Burdge, J. Russel Robinson) – 7:56
"Lines & Spaces"  – 6:20
"Body and Soul" (Frank Eyton, Johnny Green, Edward Heyman, Robert Sour) – 7:27
"Modern Man"  – 5:23
"Fort Worth"  – 6:29
"Central Park West" (John Coltrane) – 6:00
"Work" (Thelonious Monk) – 5:44
"Left Behind" (Judi Silverman) – 3:13
"His Dreams"  – 5:45
(Recorded December 28, 1991 at Skyline Studio, New York City.)

Personnel
Joe Lovano — tenor, alto, & soprano saxophones
Michel Petrucciani — piano
Dave Holland — bass
Ed Blackwell — drums

References

External links
 

Joe Lovano albums
1992 albums
Blue Note Records albums